A  list of earliest films produced in Azerbaijan SSR ordered by year of release in the 1970s:

Films:1918-1990 see also List of Soviet films

1970s

External links
 Azerbaijani film at the Internet Movie Database
 Azerbaycan Kinosu

1970
Lists of 1970s films
Films